CA or ca may refer to:

Businesses and organizations

Companies
 Air China (IATA airline code CA)
 CA Technologies, a U.S. software company
 Cayman Airways, a Cayman Islands airline
 Channel America, a defunct U.S. television network
 Classic Army, a Hong Kong-based manufacturer of airsoft replicas
 Coal & Allied, Australian mining company
 Continental Airlines, a U.S. airline
 Creative Assembly, a PC game developer
 Crédit Agricole, a major French bank

Government and political
 Bureau of Consular Affairs, a division of the U.S. Department of State
 Canadian Alliance, a former Canadian political party
 Centre Alliance, Australian political party formerly known as Nick Xenophon Team
 Citizens' Alliance, a political party in Trinidad and Tobago
 Combined authority, a local government entity in the United Kingdom
 Commission on Appointments, a body of the Congress of the Philippines
 Conservatives Abroad, overseas wing of the British Conservative Party
 Countryside Alliance, a British political organization
 Court of Appeals
 Customs Administration, an agency of Taiwan

Schools
 Canadian Academy, an international school in Kobe, Japan
 Cary Academy, a private college-preparatory school in Cary, North Carolina, United States
 Claiborne Academy, a private school in Claiborne Parish, Louisiana, United States
 Clarksville Academy, a private college-preparatory school in Clarksville, Tennessee, United States
 Colorado Academy, a private college-preparatory school in Lakewood, Colorado, United States
 Concord Academy, a private college-preparatory school in Concord, Massachusetts, United States
 Connections Academy, an online school based in Baltimore, Maryland, United States
 Culver Academies, a boarding school and summer camp program in Culver, Indiana, United States

In sport
 California Angels, former name of a professional baseball team currently known as Los Angeles Angels
 Club Africain, a multi-sport club from Tunis, Tunisia
 Cricket Australia, the governing body for professional and amateur cricket in Australia
 Cruising Association, a UK membership organization for sailors
 Cycling Australia, the national governing body for bicycle racing in Australia

Other organizations
Caterers' Association, former UK trade association
 Cocaine Anonymous, a twelve-step program
 Creativity Alliance, an arm of Creativity (religion), a white supremacist organization

In linguistics
 ca., abbreviation for circa (latin), meaning approximately
 Ça, French demonstrative pronoun
 Ca (Indic), a glyph in the Brahmic family of scripts
 Ca (Javanese), a letter in the Javanese script
 Catalan language (ISO 639 alpha-2 language code)
 ca, the subdomain for Catalan Wikipedia
 Contrastive analysis, the systematic study of a pair of languages

Mathematics, science, and technology

Biology and medicine
 CA (journal), a medical journal
 Ca (moth), a moth genus
 Ca., abbreviation for Candidatus, for taxonomical names that have not been completely described
 Cancer
 Carbonic anhydrase, a family of enzymes
 Carcinoma, a type of cancer
 Cardiac arrest

Chemistry
 Calcium, symbol Ca, a chemical element
 Catecholamine, an organic compound
 Cellulose acetate, a type of plastic
 Chemical Abstracts, a publication of Chemical Abstracts Service
 Cyanoacrylate, a chemical compound

Mathematics and computing
 Cellular automaton, a discrete mathematical model
 Certificate authority, an entity issuing digital certificates for secure communications
 Correspondence analysis, a multivariate statistical technique
 Cultural algorithm, a type of evolutionary computation in computer science

Other uses in science and technology
 Centiampere (cA), an SI unit of electric current
 Certificate Authority (CA), an entity that issues digital certificates
 CA-class submarine, a World War II Italian midget submarine
 Nissan CA engine, used in smaller Nissan vehicles
 Chromatic aberration, a distortion in optical lenses
 Conditional access, in broadcast engineering
 Conservation agriculture, a food system
 Conversation Analysis, the study of talk in interaction

Places
 Cả River, in Laos and Vietnam
 Province of Cádiz, Spain
 California, US state by postal abbreviation
 Canada, by ISO 3166-1 alpha-2 code
 .ca, Internet country code for Canada
 City of Carlisle, United Kingdom, by postcode
 Catamarca Province, Argentina
 Central America
 Tokyo Bay Aqua-Line, a bridge-tunnel across Tokyo Bay area in Japan, numbered as CA

Other uses
 CA-, a road designation for highways part of the Central American highway network
 CA, the official designation for heavy cruiser  in the U.S. Navy from 1920–1945  
 'CA': Tactical Naval Warfare in the Pacific 1941-43, a 1973 board wargame that simulates World War II naval combat
 Ca Mè Mallorquí, a dog breed native to Spain
 centiare = 1 square metre
 Chartered Accountant
 Civil affairs, a term used by both the United Nations and by military institutions
 Communication arts (disambiguation)
 Confidentiality agreement
 Current account (disambiguation), in economics
 Heavy Cruiser's US Navy hull classification

See also
 Circa (disambiguation)
 Class A (disambiguation)